The Pisani-class submarines were built for the  (Royal Italian Navy) during the late 1920s. They played a minor role in the Spanish Civil War of 1936–1939 supporting the Spanish Nationalists.

Design and description
 
Designed in parallel with the s, the Pisani class was larger to accommodate more fuel and give them more range. They displaced  surfaced and  submerged. Their crew numbered 48 officers and enlisted men.

For surface running, the boats were powered by two  diesel engines, each driving one propeller shaft. When submerged each propeller was driven by a  electric motor. Like the Mamelis, their stability was poor and they had to be modified with bulges after completion.

The boats were armed with six  torpedo tubes, four in the bow and two in the stern for which they carried a total of nine torpedoes. They were also armed with a single  deck gun forward of the conning tower for combat on the surface. Their anti-aircraft armament consisted of two  machine guns.

Boats

Service history
During the Spanish Civil War, Vettore Pisani made at least one patrol off the Catalan coast in August 1937 during which she made one unsuccessful attack.

Notes

References

External links
 Vettor Pisani Marina Militare website

Submarine classes
 Pisani
Submarines of the Regia Marina